Hercules Huncks (died 19 October 1660) was an English soldier and one of the Regicides of King Charles I of England.

Hercules Huncks was born in Warwickshire. Although the rest of his family were Royalist, he joined the Parliamentarians and attained the rank of colonel in the New Model Army. With Francis Hacker and Robert Phayre, he was one of the senior army officers delegated to supervise and carry out the King's execution. However, he refused to sign the order to the executioners, for which Oliver Cromwell berated him as a "peevish fellow". Arrested and brought to trial at the Restoration, Huncks was pardoned because he gave evidence against Daniel Axtell and Hacker.

Notes

References 
 Stephen C. Manganiello, The Concise Encyclopedia of the Revolutions and Wars of England, Scotland, and Ireland, 1639-1660, Scarecrow Press 2004, 
 Joseph Gough, Descendant of a Regicide, Trafford Publishing 2005, 

Year of birth missing
1660 deaths
Roundheads
Regicides of Charles I
Recipients of English royal pardons